Urtoxazumab is a humanized monoclonal antibody against diarrhoea caused by Escherichia coli, serotype O121. The drug is designed to bind to a toxin of this bacterium, so that it can be more easily broken down and eliminated from the body.

References 

Monoclonal antibodies
Experimental drugs